In baseball, an assist (denoted by A) is a defensive statistic, baseball being one of the few sports in which the defensive team controls the ball. An assist is credited to every defensive player who fields or touches the ball (after it has been hit by the batter) before the recording of a putout, even if the contact was unintentional. For example, if a ball strikes a player's leg and bounces off him to another fielder, who tags the baserunner, the first player is credited with an assist. A fielder can receive a maximum of one assist per out recorded. An assist is also credited if a putout would have occurred, had another fielder not committed an error. For example, a shortstop might field a ground ball cleanly, but the first baseman might drop his throw. In this case, an error would be charged to the first baseman, and the shortstop would be credited with an assist. Unlike putouts, exactly one of which is awarded for every defensive out, an out can result in no assists being credited (as in strikeouts, fly outs and line drives), or in assists being credited to multiple players (as in relay throws and rundown plays). The pitcher is the player who pitches the baseball from the pitcher's mound toward the catcher to begin each play, with the goal of retiring a batter, who attempts to either make contact with the pitched ball or draw a walk. The pitcher is often considered the most important player on the defensive side of the game, playing the most difficult and specialized position, and as such is regarded as being at the right end of the defensive spectrum. Pitchers play far less than players at other positions, generally appearing in only two or three games per week; only one pitcher in major league history has appeared in 100 games in a single season. There are many different types of pitchers, generally divided between starting pitchers and relief pitchers, which include the middle reliever, lefty specialist, setup man, and closer. In the scoring system used to record defensive plays, the pitcher is assigned the number 1.

Pitchers are most commonly credited with an assist when they field a ground ball batted back toward the mound and throw the ball either to the first baseman to retire the batter/runner, or to another infielder to force out a runner, perhaps beginning a double play; of special importance are throws to the catcher if a runner is trying to reach home plate to score a run. Pitchers also earn assists on pickoff throws, by throwing to a base after catching a line drive in order to retire a runner before they can tag up, by throwing to a base to record an out on an appeal play, or in situations where they might deflect a ground ball before another defensive player successfully fields the ball. Pitchers generally record fewer assists than infielders or catchers due to the quick reaction time needed to field the ball after it is hit, as the pitcher is the closest player in front of the batter.

As strikeout totals have risen in baseball, the frequency of other defensive outs including ground outs has declined; as a result, assist totals for pitchers have likewise declined, and only one of the top 20 career leaders has been active since 1934; only five of the top 66 have been active since 1965. None of the top 87 single-season totals were recorded after 1918, and none of the top 477 have been recorded since 1944. Cy Young is the all-time leader in career assists as a pitcher with 2,014, over 500 more than any other pitcher. Zack Greinke, who had 462 assists through the 2022 season to place him tied for 265th all-time, is the leader among active players.

Key

List

Other Hall of Famers

References

External links

Major League Baseball statistics
Assists as a right outfielder